Ibai Salas Zorrozua (born 4 July 1991 in Bilbao) is a Spanish cyclist, who is currently suspended from the sport, after a positive biological passport offence.

Suspension
In October 2018, Salas was suspended for four years due to issues with his biological passport. The case was leaked in June, and resurfaced several months later, when he was originally handed a three-year and nine-month ban, which was later extended to four years. This was the third suspension handed to a  rider in the past year, as David Belda and Igor Merino were suspended for testing positive to human growth hormone and EPO.

Major results
2015
 8th Circuito de Getxo
2017
 7th Klasika Primavera
 9th Circuito de Getxo

References

External links

1991 births
Living people
Spanish male cyclists
Cyclists from the Basque Country (autonomous community)
Sportspeople from Bilbao
Doping cases in cycling